Halbig is a German surname.

Origin
The surname Halbig is derived from the medieval personal name Heilwig or Helwig.

Notable people
Notable people with this surname include:
 Carl Halbig, founder of Simon & Halbig, German doll manufacturer
 Fabian Halbig, member of German band Killerpilze
 Johann Halbig, German sculptor
 Johannes Halbig, member of German band Killerpilze
 Jacqueline Halbig, plaintiff in the American King v. Burwell case
 Tony Halbig, German racing driver

References